Live in Concert is a live album by Najwa Karam released under the Rotana Records label. The songs were recorded during a ceremony.

Track listing
 A'ashiqa
 Yal Haneit
 Nadmaneh
 Roba'I Wa Khomasi
 Ana Meen
 Maksar A'asa
 Al Jar Abl El Dar
 Mawal Mejana
 Medley
 Walow

Najwa Karam albums
2001 live albums